Bryggenet is a community network in the Islands Brygge quarter of Copenhagen, Denmark. Bryggenet serves an area of about 4000 residences with fast Internet access, cable TV and radio, and telephone services at cost prices.

Bryggenet was started in 2001 by a group of volunteers, initially with the intent of providing fast and cheap internet access to the residents of a number of co-ops in the quarter, but the project quickly expanded into TV and telephone. All three services went live in early 2003 and have now been working for over 7 years, generally quite well. Since the start, still more co-ops and housing estates have signed up. As of mid-2005 more than 3500 apartments take part.

Internet access is provided in two sizes: 'basic internet' with 70 Mbit/s per 1000 subscribers, and 'fast internet' with 280 Mbit/s per 1000 subscribers. Prices are currently approx. $10/month and $25/month flat fee.

Cable TV is also available in two sizes: 'small' with 8 must-carry or inexpensive channels (Danish, local and Scandinavian); and 'large' with 36 channels (Danish, local, Scandianvian, English, US, German, French, Spanish, Arabic and various thematic channels). The exact composition of each package is determined by subscriber votes every few years. Prices are approx. $7/month and $25/month.

Telephone lines are provided by normal analog technology. A subscription is approx. $7/month and call rates approx. 20% lower than most commercial operators. Local calls are free of charge.

Bryggenet owns the infrastructure. The backbone is a net of fibre optic cables throughout the area, connecting each member building. The internal wiring of each building are normal cat5 PDS cables for internet and telephone, and television. Internet access is provided by a fibre optic cable to Teliasonera, one of the major Scandinavian telecom players; TV and radio signals are delivered via a set of satellite dishes locally; and telephone lines by pools of ISDN lines.

All in all Bryggenet represents an investment of about $2 million, plus countless working hours of the volunteers.

External links
website

Community networks